The Directory of National Security (abbreviated as DSN) was the secret police of Venezuela from 1938 until is disestablishment in 1958.

History 

The Directory of National Security was established in 1938 in Venezuela. The Seguridad Nacional was active during the presidencies of Eleazar López Contreras, Isaías Medina Angarita, Rómulo Betancourt, Rómulo Gallegos, Carlos Delgado Chalbaud, Germán Suárez Flamerich, and most notably, Marcos Pérez Jiménez. The purpose of the Seguridad Nacional was to investigate, arrest, torture, or assassinate political opponents to the Venezuelan government. The Seguridad Nacional was abolished following the overthrow of Pérez Jiménez on 23 January 1958.

See also 
Dirección General de Policía

References

External links 

Laws of the Directory of National Security – 1938

Defunct law enforcement agencies of Venezuela
Government agencies established in 1938
1938 establishments in Venezuela
Government agencies disestablished in 1958
1958 disestablishments in Venezuela